Pierre Perrier may refer to:

 Pierre Perrier (sport shooter)
 Pierre Perrier (scientist)